In physics, angular velocity or rotational velocity ( or ), also known as angular frequency vector, is a pseudovector representation of how fast the angular position or orientation of an object changes with time (i.e. how quickly an object rotates or revolves relative to a point or axis). The magnitude of the pseudovector represents the angular speed, the rate at which the object rotates or revolves, and its direction is normal to the instantaneous plane of rotation or angular displacement. The orientation of angular velocity is conventionally specified by the right-hand rule.

There are two types of angular velocity.
 Orbital angular velocity refers to how fast a point object revolves about a fixed origin, i.e. the time rate of change of its angular position relative to the origin. 
 Spin angular velocity refers to how fast a rigid body rotates with respect to its center of rotation and is independent of the choice of origin, in contrast to orbital angular velocity.

In general, angular velocity has dimension of angle per unit time (angle replacing distance from linear velocity with time in common). The SI unit of angular velocity is radians per second, with the radian being a dimensionless quantity, thus the SI units of angular velocity may be listed as s−1. Angular velocity is usually represented by the symbol omega (sometimes ). By convention, positive angular velocity indicates counter-clockwise rotation, while negative is clockwise.

For example, a geostationary satellite completes one orbit per day above the equator, or 360 degrees per 24 hours, and has angular velocity ω = (360°)/(24 h) = 15°/h, or (2π rad)/(24 h) ≈ 0.26 rad/h. If angle is measured in radians, the linear velocity is the radius times the angular velocity, . With orbital radius 42,000 km from the earth's center, the satellite's speed through space is thus v = 42,000 km × 0.26/h ≈ 11,000 km/h. The angular velocity is positive since the satellite travels eastward with the Earth's rotation (counter-clockwise from above the north pole.)

Orbital angular velocity of a point particle

Particle in two dimensions 

In the simplest case of circular motion at radius , with position given by the angular displacement  from the x-axis, the orbital angular velocity is the rate of change of angle with respect to time: .

In the general case of a particle moving in the plane, the orbital angular velocity is the rate at which the position vector relative to a chosen origin "sweeps out" angle. The diagram shows the position vector  from the origin  to a particle , with its polar coordinates . (All variables are functions of time .) When there is no radial component, the particle moves around the origin in a circle; but when there is no cross-radial component, it moves in a straight line from the origin. Since radial motion leaves the angle unchanged, only the cross-radial component of linear velocity contributes to angular velocity.

The angular velocity ω is the rate of change of angular position with respect to time, which can be computed from the cross-radial velocity as:

 

Taking polar coordinates for the linear velocity  gives magnitude  (linear speed) and angle  relative to the radius vector; in these terms, so that

 

These formulas may be derived doing , being  a function of the distance to the origin with respect to time, and  a function of the angle between the vector and the x axis. Knowing  we conclude that the radial component of the velocity is given by  because  is a radial unit vector; and the perpendicular component is given by  because  is a perpendicular unit vector.

In two dimensions, angular velocity is a number with plus or minus sign indicating orientation, but not pointing in a direction. The sign is conventionally taken to be positive if the radius vector turns counter-clockwise, and negative if clockwise. Angular velocity then may be termed a pseudoscalar, a numerical quantity which changes sign under a parity inversion, such as inverting one axis or switching the two axes.

Particle in three dimensions 

In  three-dimensional space, we again have the position vector r of a moving particle. Here, orbital angular velocity is a pseudovector whose magnitude is the rate at which r sweeps out angle, and whose direction is perpendicular to the instantaneous plane in which r sweeps out angle (i.e. the plane spanned by r and v). However, as there are two directions perpendicular to any plane, an additional condition is necessary to uniquely specify the direction of the angular velocity; conventionally, the right-hand rule is used.

Let the pseudovector  be the unit vector perpendicular to the plane spanned by r and v, so that the right-hand rule is satisfied (i.e. the instantaneous direction of angular displacement is counter-clockwise looking from the top of ). Taking polar coordinates  in this plane, as in the two-dimensional case above, one may define the orbital angular velocity vector as:

 

where θ is the angle between r and v. In terms of the cross product, this is:

 

From the above equation, one can recover the tangential velocity as:

Spin angular velocity of a rigid body or reference frame 

Given a rotating frame of three unit coordinate vectors, all the three must have the same angular speed at each instant. In such a frame, each vector may be considered as a moving particle with constant scalar radius.

The rotating frame appears in the context of rigid bodies, and special tools have been developed for it: the spin angular velocity may be described as a vector or equivalently as a tensor.

Consistent with the general definition, the spin angular velocity of a frame is defined as the orbital angular velocity of any of the three vectors (same for all) with respect to its own center of rotation. The addition of angular velocity vectors for frames is also defined by the usual vector addition (composition of linear movements), and can be useful to decompose the rotation as in a gimbal. All components of the vector can be calculated as derivatives of the parameters defining the moving frames (Euler angles or rotation matrices). As in the general case, addition is commutative: .

By Euler's rotation theorem, any rotating frame possesses an instantaneous axis of rotation, which is the direction of the angular velocity vector, and the magnitude of the angular velocity is consistent with the two-dimensional case.

If we choose a reference point  fixed in the rigid body, the  velocity  of  any point in the body is given by

Components from the basis vectors of a body-fixed frame 

Consider a rigid body rotating about a fixed point O. Construct a reference frame in the body consisting of an orthonormal set of vectors  fixed to the body and with their common origin at O. The spin angular velocity vector of both frame and body about O is then
 
where  is the time rate of change of the frame vector   due to the rotation.

Note that this formula is incompatible with the expression for orbital angular velocity

 

as that formula defines angular velocity for a single point about O, while the formula in this section applies to a frame or rigid body. In the case of a rigid body a single  has to account for the motion of all particles in the body.

Components from Euler angles 

The components of the spin angular velocity pseudovector were first calculated by Leonhard Euler using his Euler angles and the use of an intermediate frame:
 One axis of the reference frame (the precession axis)
 The line of nodes of the moving frame with respect to the reference frame (nutation axis)
 One axis of the moving frame (the intrinsic rotation axis)

Euler proved that the projections of the angular velocity pseudovector on each of these three axes is the derivative of its associated angle (which is equivalent to decomposing the instantaneous rotation into three instantaneous Euler rotations). Therefore:

 

This basis is not orthonormal and it is difficult to use, but now the velocity vector can be changed to the fixed frame or to the moving frame with just a change of bases. For example, changing to the mobile frame:

 

where  are unit vectors for the frame fixed in the moving body. This example has been made using the Z-X-Z convention for Euler angles.

Tensor  

The angular velocity vector  defined above may be equivalently expressed as an angular velocity tensor, the matrix (or linear mapping) W = W(t) defined by:

 

This is an infinitesimal rotation matrix. The linear mapping W acts as :

Calculation from the orientation matrix

A vector  undergoing uniform circular motion around a fixed axis satisfies:

Given the orientation matrix A(t) of a frame, whose columns are the moving orthonormal coordinate vectors , we can obtain its angular velocity tensor W(t) as follows. Angular velocity must be the same for the three vectors , so arranging the three vector equations into columns of a matrix, we have:

 

(This holds even if A(t) does not rotate uniformly.) Therefore the angular velocity tensor is:

 

since the inverse of the orthogonal matrix  is its transpose .

Properties 

In general, the angular velocity in an n-dimensional space is the time derivative of the angular displacement tensor, which is a second rank skew-symmetric tensor.

This tensor W will have  independent components, which is the dimension of the Lie algebra of the Lie group of rotations of an n-dimensional inner product space.

Duality with respect to the velocity vector 

In three dimensions, angular velocity can be represented by a pseudovector because second rank tensors are dual to pseudovectors in three dimensions. Since the angular velocity tensor W = W(t) is a skew-symmetric matrix:

 

its Hodge dual is a vector, which is precisely the previous angular velocity vector .

Exponential of W 

If we know an initial frame A(0) and we are given a constant angular velocity tensor W, we can obtain A(t) for any given t. Recall the matrix differential equation:

 

This equation can be integrated to give:

 

which shows a connection with the Lie group of rotations.

W is skew-symmetric 
We prove that angular velocity tensor is skew symmetric, i.e.  satisfies .

A rotation matrix A is orthogonal, inverse to its transpose, so we have . For  a frame matrix, taking the time derivative of the equation gives:

 

Applying the formula ,

 

Thus, W is the negative of its transpose, which implies it is skew symmetric.

Coordinate-free description 
At any instant , the angular velocity tensor represents a linear map between the position vector  and the velocity vectors  of a point on a rigid body rotating around the origin:

 

The relation between this linear map and the angular velocity pseudovector  is the following.

Because W is the derivative of an orthogonal transformation, the bilinear form

 

is skew-symmetric. Thus we can apply the fact of exterior algebra that there is a unique linear form  on  that

 

Taking the sharp L of L we get

 

Introducing , as the Hodge dual of L, and applying the definition of the Hodge dual twice supposing that the preferred unit 3-vector is 

 

where

 

by definition.

Because  is an arbitrary vector, from nondegeneracy of scalar product follows

Angular velocity as a vector field 
Since the spin angular velocity tensor of a rigid body (in its rest frame) is a linear transformation that maps positions to velocities (within the rigid body), it can be regarded as a constant vector field. In particular, the spin angular velocity is a Killing vector field belonging to an element of the Lie algebra SO(3) of the 3-dimensional rotation group SO(3).

Also, it can be shown that the spin angular velocity vector field is exactly half of the curl of the linear velocity vector field v(r) of the rigid body. In symbols,

Rigid body considerations 

The same equations for the angular speed can be obtained reasoning over a rotating rigid body. Here is not assumed that the rigid body rotates around the origin. Instead, it can be supposed rotating around an arbitrary point that is moving with a linear velocity V(t) in each instant.

To obtain the equations, it is convenient to imagine a rigid body attached to the frames and consider a coordinate system that is fixed with respect to the rigid body. Then we will study the coordinate transformations between this coordinate and the fixed "laboratory" system.

It is seen that the position of the particle can be written:

 

The defining characteristic of a rigid body is that the distance between any two points in a rigid body is unchanging in time. This means that the length of the vector  is unchanging. This replacement is useful, because now it is only the rotation matrix  that is changing in time and not the reference vector , as the rigid body rotates about point . Also, since the three columns of the rotation matrix represent the three versors of a reference frame rotating together with the rigid body, any rotation about any axis becomes now visible, while the vector  would not rotate if the rotation axis were parallel to it, and hence it would only describe a rotation about an axis perpendicular to it (i.e., it would not see the component of the angular velocity pseudovector parallel to it, and would only allow the computation of the component perpendicular to it). The position of the particle is now written as:

 

Taking the time derivative yields the velocity of the particle:

 

Since  is a rotation matrix its inverse is its transpose. So we substitute :

 

 

 

or

 

where  is the previous angular velocity tensor.

It can be proved that this is a skew symmetric matrix, so we can take its dual to get a 3 dimensional pseudovector that is precisely the previous angular velocity vector :

 

Substituting ω for W into the above velocity expression, and replacing matrix multiplication by an equivalent cross product:

 

It can be seen that the velocity of a point in a rigid body can be divided into two terms – the velocity of a reference point fixed in the rigid body plus the cross product term involving the orbital angular velocity of the particle with respect to the reference point. This angular velocity is what physicists call the "spin angular velocity" of the rigid body, as opposed to the orbital angular velocity of the reference point  about the origin O.

Consistency 
We have supposed that the rigid body rotates around an arbitrary point. We should prove that the spin angular velocity previously defined is independent of the choice of origin, which means that the spin angular velocity is an intrinsic property of the spinning rigid body. (Note the marked contrast of this with the orbital angular velocity of a point particle, which certainly does depend on the choice of origin.)

Since point P and O2 have only one velocity,

 

 

The above two yields that

 

Since the point P (and thus ) is arbitrary, it follows that

 

If the reference point is the instantaneous axis of rotation the expression of the velocity of a point in the rigid body will have just the angular velocity term. This is because the velocity of the instantaneous axis of rotation is zero. An example of the instantaneous axis of rotation is the hinge of a door. Another example is the point of contact of a purely rolling spherical (or, more generally, convex) rigid body.

See also 
 Angular acceleration
 Angular frequency
 Angular momentum
 Areal velocity
 Isometry
 Orthogonal group
 Rigid body dynamics
 Vorticity

References

External links 

  A college text-book of physics By Arthur Lalanne Kimball (Angular Velocity of a particle)
 

Angle
Kinematic properties
Rotational symmetry
Temporal rates
Tensors
Velocity